Miletino is a village in the municipality of Brvenica, North Macedonia.

History
According to the 1467-68 Ottoman defter, Miletino appears as being largely inhabited by an Orthodox Christian Albanian population. Some families had a mixed Slav-Albanian anthroponomy - usually a Slavic first name and an Albanian last name or last names with Albanian patronyms and Slavic suffixes.

The names are: Nikolla Arbanas; Mihail, his son; Mihail, son of Mar-k-a- Gjon; Niko (Pet-ko),son of Bardo; Gjorgji, his brother; Dimitri, son of Visan; Pelegrin, son of Visan; Bard-o, immigrant; Andre-ja Arbanas (t.Arnaut); Gurgur Arbanas (t.Arnaut); Bogdan, son of Doran; Gjon, son of Bardo; Dimitri, son of Todor; Dimitri, son of Nik-o-; Gjon, his son; Ilçe, son of Marin; Gjonova, widow; Mara, widow; Janko, son of Gjon; Lazor, son of Rale; Lamb-o, the son of Rale; Lamb-o, the son of Boja; Gjon, his brother; Lazor, son of Hutan; Dimitri, son of Tan-ço; Dimitri the son of Man-ko; Meno, son of Tanush; Lazor, son of Tan-çe; Lamb-o, the son of Nik-çe; Jovan, son of Gjin-o; Nik-o, son of Tanush.

Demographics
As of the 2021 census, Miletino had 1,674 residents with the following ethnic composition:
Albanians 1,105
Macedonians 501
Persons for whom data are taken from administrative sources 64
Others 4 

According to the 2002 census, the village had a total of 1,986 inhabitants.

Ethnic groups in the village include:
Albanians – 1,336
Macedonians – 642
Serbs – 2
Others – 6

Sports
Local football club KF Rrufeja plays in the OFS Tetovo league.

References

External links

Villages in Brvenica Municipality
Albanian communities in North Macedonia